The 1980–81 NCAA Division I men's ice hockey season began in October 1980 and concluded with the 1981 NCAA Division I Men's Ice Hockey Tournament's championship game on March 28, 1981 at the Duluth Arena in Duluth, Minnesota. This was the 34th season in which an NCAA ice hockey championship was held and is the 87th year overall where an NCAA school fielded a team.

For the first time the Hobey Baker Award was conferred after the conclusion of the regular season.

After the season four teams from the WCHA left to join the CCHA. As a result of dividing the four Big Ten schools that had previously been in the WCHA the Big Ten stopped declaring a conference ice hockey champion until the formation of a separate conference in 2013–14.

Regular season

Season tournaments

Standings

1981 NCAA Tournament

Note: * denotes overtime period(s)

Player stats

Scoring leaders
The following players led the league in points at the conclusion of the season.

  
GP = Games played; G = Goals; A = Assists; Pts = Points; PIM = Penalty minutes

Leading goaltenders
The following goaltenders led the league in goals against average at the end of the regular season while playing at least 33% of their team's total minutes.

GP = Games played; Min = Minutes played; W = Wins; L = Losses; OT = Overtime/shootout losses; GA = Goals against; SO = Shutouts; SV% = Save percentage; GAA = Goals against average

Awards

NCAA

CCHA

ECAC

WCHA

See also
 1980–81 NCAA Division II men's ice hockey season
 1980–81 NCAA Division III men's ice hockey season

References

External links
College Hockey Historical Archives
1980–81 NCAA Standings

 
NCAA